The Lavaca River is a navigable river in the U.S. state of Texas.  It begins in the northeastern part of Gonzales County, and travels generally southeast for  until it empties into Lavaca Bay, which is a component of Matagorda Bay.

History
The navigable Texas river's name is a corruption of Rivière des Vaches ("Cow River"), by French explorer René-Robert Cavelier, Sieur de La Salle.  The flagship of Jean Laffite's fleet was alleged to have been scuttled in the lower part of the river.

Economy
Hallettsville, and Moulton, Texas, are included this river section's river authority is Lavaca-Navidad River Authority, which was established in 1941.

See also
 List of rivers of Texas
 Port Lavaca, Texas

Notes

Rivers of Texas
Rivers of Gonzales County, Texas
Rivers of Jackson County, Texas
Rivers of Lavaca County, Texas
Rivers of Calhoun County, Texas